Corpus Christi Catholic High School is a coeducational secondary school located in Fulwood (near Preston) in the English county of Lancashire.

It is a voluntary aided school administered by Lancashire County Council and the Roman Catholic Diocese of Lancaster. The school offers GCSEs, BTECs and vocational courses as programmes of study for pupils.

The Jack McLaughlin Engineering Centre is located at the front of the school grounds. It is a study centre for engineering and auto-engineering, with pupils from Corpus Christi and other local schools able to attend.

References

External links
Corpus Christi Catholic High School official website

Secondary schools in Lancashire
Schools in Preston
Catholic secondary schools in the Diocese of Lancaster
Voluntary aided schools in England